"Better" is a song by Australian musician Mallrat. It was released in October 2017 as the lead single from Mallrat's second EP In the Sky.

In May 2018, the song won Best Unpublished Work in the Vanda & Young Global Songwriting Competition.

The song was certified gold in Australia in 2019.

Background
Mallrat said she wrote the songs in July 2016 saying "the lyrics were very easy to write but it took about a year to get the instrumentation sounding exactly like it did in my brain."

Reception
Thomas Smith from NME called the song a "youthful, joyous uplifting banger."

Track listing
Digital download
 "Better" – 3:13

Certifications

References

2017 singles
2017 songs
Mallrat songs
Song recordings produced by Konstantin Kersting
Songs written by Mallrat